Doungou Camara (born 7 January 1995) is a French born-Senegalese handball player for Fleury Loiret HB and the Senegalese national team.

She competed 2012/13 Cup Winners' Cup and 2013/14 Challenge Cup, placing second both times.

References

External links

1995 births
Living people
French female handball players
African Games bronze medalists for Senegal
African Games medalists in handball
Competitors at the 2015 African Games
Senegalese female handball players
Sportspeople from Seine-et-Marne
Black French sportspeople
French sportspeople of Senegalese descent